is a Japanese voice actress affiliated by 81 Produce.

Some of her starring roles are Yao Sakurakouji in Miami Guns, Ran Kotobuki in Super Gals!, Winry Rockbell in Fullmetal Alchemist (first anime), Sei Sato in Maria-sama ga Miteru, Hikari (Dawn) in Pokémon, Revy in Black Lagoon, Seiren/Ellen Kurokawa/Cure Beat in Suite Precure and Miriallia Haw in Mobile Suite Gundam SEED & Mobile Suite GUNDAM SEED DESTINY. In video games, she played Paine in Final Fantasy X-2, Junko Enoshima in Danganronpa, Rosie in Valkyria Chronicles, Yukari Takeba in Persona 3 (which has adapted into a film series) and Aqua in Kingdom Hearts.

Biography

When she was in the upper grades of elementary school, she became addicted to anime when she watched Dragon Ball and became a fan of Tōru Furuya who played the role of Yamcha in the anime series. While she was in her second year of high school, she watched Furuya's role in Dragon Quest, and while imitating the characters, she became interested in working as a voice actress.

After graduating from high school, her parents requested a vocational school of voice actors, but were told to go to high school. After graduating from high school, she had the goal of becoming a voice actor in Nihon Kogakuin, but opposed her family. She wanted to get a job related to voice actors and switch to the Department of Acoustics and Arts to become a radio personality. In radio program production training, she mainly practiced personality by taking charge of personality, and was used in subsequent radio conversations.

Though she was a student at the same school, she requested the Mars Girl Audition for the radio program Hiroi Oji no Multi Heaven. From high school until now, she had failed several auditions, so finished the test. However, she won the Grand Prix and made a regular appearance on the radio. Later, Shigeru Chiba, who co-starred on the radio, became a member of 81 Produce, in that same period as Chie Chiba and Ryoka Kashiwagi.

In 2007, she expanded the scope of her work, including the dubbing roles of the main character Kanna in The great success of Kanna!. The following year, she made her first appearance as a voice actress in Drama Battle Royale Gun Mage and The First Stage.

Personal life
She reported in the end of 2016 that she was married and pregnant. She took a bit of time off to prepare for having a baby. She is very interested in theater.

Filmography

Anime

Film

Drama CD

Video games

Dubbing

Discography

Other songs
"Hai Tatchi!" (Opening for Pokémon: Diamond and Pearl, sung with Rika Matsumoto)
"Hai Tatchi! 2009" (Opening song of Gekijoban Pocket Monsters Diamond and Pearl: Arceus Chōkoku no Jikū e, and Opening for Pokémon: Diamond and Pearl, sung with Rika Matsumoto)

References

External links
 

1978 births
Living people
Japanese video game actresses
Japanese voice actresses
People from Machida, Tokyo
Voice actresses from Tokyo Metropolis
81 Produce voice actors
20th-century Japanese actresses
21st-century Japanese actresses